Ezio Franceschini (Villa Agnedo, 25 July 1906 - Padua, 21 March 1983) was a Latin scholar and philologist, professor of medieval Latin literature, as well as rector of the Università Cattolica del Sacro Cuore (UCSC).

Biography
When Francesco Vito died, Ezio Franceschini was elected the third rector of UCSC (1965–1968) and faced the rise of student protest of 1968.
Franceschini was a corresponding member since 1947 and national member since 1959 of Accademia dei Lincei.

References

1906 births
1983 deaths
People from Trentino
Italian educators
Italian Latinists